Worthless or The Worthless may refer to:

 The Worthless, a 1908 play by Jacob Gordin
 The Worthless (film), a 1982 Finnish film

Music 
 Worthless, a 2011 album by Weekend Nachos
 "Worthless", a song by A Thorn for Every Heart from It's Hard to Move You
 "Worthless", a song by Agoraphobic Nosebleed from Bestial Machinery (Discography Volume 1)
 "Worthless", a song by Bosnian Rainbows from Bosnian Rainbows
 "Worthless", a song by Bullet for My Valentine from Live from Brixton: Chapter Two and Venom
 "Worthless", a song by Buried Alive from The Death of Your Perfect World
 "Worthless", a song by Charon from A-Sides, B-Sides & Suicides and Tearstained
 "Worthless", a song by Chimaira from Resurrection
 "Worthless", a song by Colossus from Badlands
 "The Worthless", a song by Dååth from The Concealers
 "Worthless", a song by Dido from Odds & Ends
 "Worthless", a song by Doomriders from Black Thunder
 "Worthless", a song by Faithless from Faithless – Renaissance 3D
 "Worthless", a song by Home Grown from That's Business
 "Worthless", a song by Ministry from Adios... Puta Madres, Houses of the Molé, and MiXXXes of the Molé
 "Worthless", a song by No Secrets, leftover track from No Secrets
 "Worthless", a song by Point of Grace from I Choose You
 "Worthless", a song by Pretty Maids from Planet Panic
 "Worthless", a song by The Acacia Strain from Gravebloom
 "Worthless", a song by The Exit from New Beat
 "Worthless", a song by Whitehouse from Mummy and Daddy
 "Worthless", a song by X Marks the Pedwalk from The Killing Had Begun
 "Worthless", a song by Young Fresh Fellows from Because We Hate You
 "Worthless", a song by Your Demise from The Golden Age
 "Worthless", a song from the film The Brave Little Toaster

See also 
 Unworthy (disambiguation)